The Nokia XR20 is a Nokia-branded smartphone that has been manufactured by HMD Global.

The Nokia XR20 is also the last Nokia-branded smartphone that utilizes Zeiss optics due to HMD Global and Zeiss mutually parting way from the partnership.

References

External links 
 

XR20
Phablets
Mobile phones introduced in 2021
Mobile phones with multiple rear cameras